Rothwell Corinthians F.C. is a football club based in Rothwell, Northamptonshire, England.

History
The Rothwell Corinthians were founded in 1934 as a church youth side, joining the Kettering Amateur League, which became the East Midlands Alliance. For many years, the Corinthians lived in the shadow of near neighbours Rothwell Town until Town folded.

The club started out playing at the local recreation ground, moving to Rothwell Town's cricket ground in the early 1980s, and starting to conduct their affairs more seriously. The East Midlands Alliance too raised its game, and in 1984 the Corinthians gained promotion to the Premier Division. The club purchased land in Desborough Road.  Their present ground opened in 1988.

In 1989–90 the Corinthians won the Premier Division championship for the first time, and 1994–95 saw a repeat. Following discussions with the management committee, Corinthians were admitted to the United Counties League for the 1995–96 season. Ground improvements continued; floodlighting was installed in 1999, which has enabled the club to compete in the FA Vase.

The club enjoyed a successful period from 2007 to 2008, their third-place finish in Division One, proving sufficient to earn promotion to the Premier Division. Successive managers failed to keep Corinthians in the top flight and relegation to Division One was confirmed in 2010–11.

2014-15 proved to be the most successful season in Corinthians history. A highly impressive season with highlights such as a 10-game winning run which included 8 consecutive clean sheets, led to a second-place finish in United Counties League Division One and ultimately a return to the Premier Division.

In the 2015–16 season, Rothwell Corinthians are playing in the United Counties League Premier Division, led by manager Shaun Sparrow.

Players

Current squad

 (capt)

Officials

External links

 FA Full-Time (ChromaSport & Trophies United Counties League - 2014/2015)

Football clubs in Northamptonshire
Football clubs in England